Jean Arthur (born Gladys Georgianna Greene; October 17, 1900 – June 19, 1991) was an American Broadway and film actress whose career began in silent films in the early 1920s and lasted until the early 1950s.

Arthur had feature roles in three Frank Capra films: Mr. Deeds Goes to Town (1936) with Gary Cooper, You Can't Take It with You (1938) co-starring James Stewart, and Mr. Smith Goes to Washington (1939), also starring Stewart. These three films all championed the "everyday heroine", personified by Arthur. She also co-starred with Cary Grant in the adventure-drama Only Angels Have Wings (1939) and in the comedy-drama The Talk of the Town (1942). She starred as the lead in the acclaimed and highly successful comedy films The Devil and Miss Jones (1941) and A Foreign Affair (1948), the latter of which she starred alongside Marlene Dietrich. Arthur was nominated for an Academy Award for Best Actress in 1944 for her performance in The More the Merrier (1943), a comedy which also starred Joel McCrea.

James Harvey wrote in his history of the romantic comedy: "No one was more closely identified with the screwball comedy than Jean Arthur. So much was she part of it, so much was her star personality defined by it, that the screwball style itself seems almost unimaginable without her." She has been called "the quintessential comedic leading lady". Her last film performance was non-comedic, playing the homesteader's wife in George Stevens's Shane in 1953.

Like Greta Garbo, Arthur was well known in Hollywood for her aversion to publicity; she rarely signed autographs or granted interviews. Life magazine observed in a 1940 article: "Next to Garbo, Jean Arthur is Hollywood's reigning mystery woman." As well as recoiling from interviews, after a certain age she avoided photographers and refused to become a part of any kind of publicity.

Early life

Arthur was born Gladys Georgianna Greene in Plattsburgh, New York, to Protestant parents, Johanna Augusta Nelson and Hubert Sidney Greene. Gladys' Lutheran maternal grandparents immigrated from Norway to the American West after the Civil War. Her Congregationalist paternal ancestors immigrated from England to Rhode Island in the second half of the 1600s. During the 1790s, Nathaniel Greene helped found the town of St. Albans, Vermont, where his great-grandson, Hubert Greene, was born.

Johanna and Hubert were married in Billings, Montana, on July 7, 1890. Gladys's three older brothers—Donald Hubert Greene, Robert Brazier Greene, and Albert Sidney Greene—were born in the West.  Around 1897, Hubert moved his wife and three sons from Billings to Plattsburgh, NY, so he could work as a photographer at the Woodward Studios on Clinton Street. Johanna gave birth to stillborn twins on April 1, 1898.

Two and a half years later, Johanna gave birth to Gladys. The product of a nomadic childhood, the future Jean Arthur lived at times in Saranac Lake, New York; Jacksonville, Florida, where George Woodward, Hubert's Plattsburgh employer, opened a second studio; and Schenectady, New York, where Hubert had grown up and where several members of his family still lived. The Greenes lived on and off in Westbrook, Maine, from 1908 to 1915 while Gladys's father worked at Lamson Studios in Portland. Relocating in 1915 to New York City, the family settled in the Washington Heights neighborhood – at 573 West 159th Street – of upper Manhattan, and Hubert worked at Ira L. Hill's photographic studio on Fifth Avenue.

Gladys dropped out of high school in her junior year due to a "change in family circumstances". Presaging many of her later film roles, she worked as a stenographer on Bond Street in lower Manhattan during and after World War I. Both her father (at age 55, claiming to be 45) and siblings registered for the draft. Her brother Albert died in 1926 as a result of respiratory injuries suffered during a mustard gas attack during World War I.

Career

Silent film

Discovered by Fox Film Studios while she was doing commercial modeling in New York City in the early 1920s, the newly named Jean Arthur landed a one-year contract and debuted in the silent film Cameo Kirby (1923), directed by John Ford. She reputedly took her stage name from two of her greatest heroes, Joan of Arc (Jeanne d'Arc) and King Arthur. The studio was at the time looking for new American sweethearts with sufficient sex appeal to interest the Jazz Age audiences. Arthur was remodeled as such a personality, a flapper.

Following the small role in Cameo Kirby, she received her first female lead role in The Temple of Venus (1923), a plotless tale about a group of dancing nymphs. Dissatisfied with her lack of acting talent, the film's director Henry Otto replaced Arthur with actress Mary Philbin during the third day of shooting. Arthur agreed with the director: "There wasn't a spark from within. I was acting like a mechanical doll personality. I thought I was disgraced for life."

Arthur was planning on leaving the California film industry for good, but reluctantly stayed due to her contract, and appeared in comedy shorts instead. Despite lacking the required talent, Arthur liked acting, which she perceived as an "outlet". To acquire some fame, she registered herself in the Los Angeles city directory as a photo player operator, as well as appearing in a promotional film for a new Encino nightclub, but to no avail.

Change came when one day she showed up at the lot of Action Pictures, which produced B Westerns, and impressed its owner Lester F. Scott Jr., with her presence. He decided to take a chance on a complete unknown, and she was cast in over 20 Westerns in a two-year period. Only receiving $25 a picture, Arthur suffered from difficult working conditions: "The films were generally shot on location, often in the desert near Los Angeles, under a scorching sun that caused throats to parch and make-up to run. Running water was nowhere to be found, and even outhouses were a luxury not always present. The extras on these films were often real cowboys, tough men who were used to roughing it and who had little use for those who were not." The films were moderately successful in second-rate Midwestern theaters, though Arthur received no official attention. Aside from appearing in films for Action Pictures between 1924 and 1926, she worked in some independent Westerns, including The Drug Store Cowboy (1925), and Westerns for Poverty Row, as well as having an uncredited bit part in Buster Keaton's Seven Chances (1925) as the receptionist.

In 1927, Arthur attracted more attention when she appeared opposite Mae Busch and Charles Delaney as a gold-digging chorus girl in Husband Hunters. Subsequently, she was romanced by actor Monty Banks in Horse Shoes (1927), both a commercial and critical success. She was cast on Banks's insistence, and received a salary of $700. Next, director Richard Wallace ignored Fox's wishes to cast a more experienced actress by assigning Arthur to the female lead in The Poor Nut (1927), a college comedy which gave her wide exposure to audiences. A reviewer for Variety did not spare the actress in his review:
With everyone in Hollywood bragging about the tremendous overflow of charming young women all battering upon the directorial doors leading to an appearance in pictures, it seems strange that from all these should have been selected two flat specimens such as Jean Arthur and Jane Winton. Neither of the girls has screen presence. Even under the kindliest treatment from the camera, they are far from attractive and in one or two side shots almost impossible.

Fed up with the direction that her career was taking, Arthur expressed her desire for a big break in an interview at the time. She was skeptical when signed to a small role in Warming Up (1928), a film produced for a big studio, Famous Players-Lasky, and featuring major star Richard Dix. Promoted as the studio's first sound film, it received wide media attention, and Arthur earned praise for her portrayal of a club owner's daughter. Variety opined, "Dix and Arthur are splendid in spite of the wretched material", while Screenland wrote that Arthur "is one of the most charming young kissees who ever officiated in a Dix film. Jean is winsome; she neither looks nor acts like the regular movie heroine. She's a nice girl – but she has her moments." The success of Warming Up resulted in Arthur being signed to a three-year contract with the studio, soon to be known as Paramount Pictures, at $150 a week.

Transition to sound film

With the rise of the talkies in the late 1920s, Arthur was among the many silent-screen actors of Paramount Pictures initially unwilling to adapt to sound films. Upon realizing that the craze for sound films was not a phase, she met with sound coach Roy Pomeroy. Her distinctive, throaty voice – in addition to some stage training on Broadway in the early 1930s – eventually helped make her a star in the talkies, but it initially prevented directors from casting her in films. In her early talkies, this "throaty" voice is still missing, and  whether it had not yet emerged or whether she hid it remains unclear. Her all-talking film debut was The Canary Murder Case (1929), in which she co-starred opposite William Powell and Louise Brooks. Arthur impressed only a few with the film, and later claimed that at the time she was a "very poor actress ... awfully anxious to improve, but ... inexperienced so far as genuine training was concerned."

In the early years of talking pictures, Paramount was known for contracting Broadway actors with experienced vocals and impressive background references. Arthur was not among these actors, and she struggled for recognition in the film industry. Her personal involvement with rising Paramount executive David O. Selznick – despite his relationship with Irene Mayer Selznick – proved substantial; she was put on the map and became selected as one of the WAMPAS Baby Stars in 1929. Following a silent B-western called Stairs of Sand (1929), she received some positive notices when she played the female lead in the lavish production of The Mysterious Dr. Fu Manchu (1929). Arthur was given more publicity assignments, which she carried out,  though she immensely disliked posing for photographers and giving interviews.

Through Selznick, Arthur received her "best role to date" opposite famous sex symbol Clara Bow in the early sound film The Saturday Night Kid (1929). Of the two female leads, Arthur was thought to have "the better part", and director Edward Sutherland claimed, "Arthur was so good that we had to cut and cut to keep her from stealing the picture" from Bow. While some argued that Bow resented Arthur for having the "better part," Bow encouraged Arthur to make the most of the production. Arthur later praised her working experience with Bow: "[Bow] was so generous, no snootiness or anything. She was wonderful to me." The film was a moderate success, and The New York Times wrote that the film would have been "merely commonplace, were it not for Jean Arthur, who plays the catty sister with a great deal of skill."

Following a role in Halfway to Heaven (1929) opposite popular actor Charles "Buddy" Rogers (of which Variety opined that her career could be heading somewhere if she acquired more sex appeal), Selznick assigned her to play William Powell's wife in Street of Chance (1930). She did not impress the film's director John Cromwell, who advised the actress to move back to New York because she would not make it in Hollywood. By 1930, her relationship with Selznick had ended, causing her career at Paramount to slip. Following a string of "lifeless ingenue roles" in mediocre films, she debuted on stage in December 1930 with a supporting role in Pasadena Playhouse's 10-day production run of Spring Song. Back in Hollywood, Arthur saw her career deteriorating, and she dyed her hair blonde in an attempt to boost her image and avoid comparison with more successful actress Mary Brian. Her effort did not pay off; when her three-year contract at Paramount expired in mid-1931, she was given her release with an announcement from Paramount that the decision was due to financial setbacks caused by the Great Depression.

Broadway and Columbia Pictures

In late 1931, Arthur returned to New York City, where a Broadway agent cast Arthur in an adaptation of Lysistrata, which opened at the Riviera Theater on January 24, 1932. A few months later, she made her Broadway debut in Foreign Affairs opposite Dorothy Gish and Osgood Perkins. Though the play did not fare well and closed after 23 performances, critics were impressed by her work on stage. She next won the female lead in The Man Who Reclaimed His Head, which opened on September 8, 1932, at the Broadhurst Theatre to mostly mixed notices for Arthur; negative reviews for the play caused the production to be halted quickly. Arthur returned to California for the holidays, and appeared in the RKO film The Past of Mary Holmes (1933), her first film in two years.

Back on Broadway, Arthur continued to appear in small plays that received little attention. Critics, however, continued to praise her in their reviews. In this period, Arthur arguably developed confidence in her acting craft for the first time. On the contrast between films in Hollywood and plays in New York, Arthur commented:

I don't think Hollywood is the place to be yourself. The individual ought to find herself before coming to Hollywood. On the stage I found myself to be in a different world. The individual counted. The director encouraged me and I learned how to be myself.... I learned to face audiences and to forget them. To see the footlights and not to see them; to gauge the reactions of hundreds of people, and yet to throw myself so completely into a role that I was oblivious to their reaction.

The Curtain Rises, which ran from October to December 1933, was Arthur's first Broadway play in which she was the center of attention. With an improved résumé, she returned to Hollywood in late 1933, and turned down several contract offers until she was asked to meet with an executive from Columbia Pictures. Arthur agreed to star in a film, Whirlpool (1934), and during production, she was offered a long-term contract that promised financial stability for both of her parents and her. Though hesitant to give up her stage career, Arthur signed the five-year contract on February 14, 1934.

In 1935, at age 34, Arthur starred opposite Edward G. Robinson in the gangster farce The Whole Town's Talking, also directed by Ford, and her popularity began to rise. It was the first time Arthur portrayed a hard-boiled working girl with a heart of gold, the type of role with which she would be associated for the rest of her career. She enjoyed the acting experience and working opposite Robinson, who remarked in his biography that it was a "delight to work with and know" Arthur. By the time of the film's release, her hair, naturally brunette throughout the silent film portion of her career, was bleached blonde and mostly stayed that way. She was known for maneuvering to be photographed and filmed almost exclusively from the left; Arthur felt that her left was her better side, and worked hard to keep it in the fore. Director Frank Capra recalled producer Harry Cohn's description of Jean Arthur's imbalanced profile: "half of it's angel, and the other half horse."

Her next few films, Party Wire (1935), Public Hero No. 1 (1935), and If You Could Only Cook (1935), did not match the success of The Whole Town's Talking, but they all brought the actress positive reviews. In his review for The New York Times, critic Andre Sennwald praised Arthur's performance in Public Hero No. 1, writing that she "is as refreshing a change from the routine it-girl as Joseph Calleia is in his own department." Another critic wrote of her performance in If You Could Only Cook that "[she is] outstanding as she effortlessly slips from charming comedienne to beautiful romantic." With her now apparent rise to fame, Arthur was able to extract several contractual concessions from Harry Cohn, such as script and director approval and the right to make films for other studios.

The turning point in Arthur's career came when she was chosen by Frank Capra to star in Mr. Deeds Goes to Town (1936). Capra had spotted her in a daily rush from the film Whirlpool in 1934 and convinced Cohn to have Columbia Studios sign her for his next film as a tough newspaperwoman who falls in love with a country bumpkin millionaire. Though several colleagues later recalled that Arthur was troubled by extreme stage fright during production, Mr. Deeds was critically acclaimed and propelled her to international stardom. In 1936 alone, she earned $119,000, more than the President of the United States and baseball star Lou Gehrig combined.

With fame also came media attention, something Arthur greatly disliked. She did not attend any social gatherings, such as formal parties in Hollywood, and acted difficult when having to work with an interviewer. She was named the American Greta Garbo – who was also known for her reclusive life – and magazine Movie Classic wrote of her in 1937: "With Garbo talking right out loud in interviews, receiving the press and even welcoming an occasional chance to say her say in the public prints, the palm for elusiveness among screen stars now goes to Jean Arthur."

Arthur's next film was The Ex-Mrs. Bradford (1936), on loan to RKO Pictures, in which she starred opposite William Powell on his insistence, and hoped to take a long vacation afterwards. Cohn, however, rushed her into two more productions, Adventure in Manhattan (1936) and More Than a Secretary (1936). Neither film attracted much attention.

Next, again without pause, she was reteamed with Cooper, playing Calamity Jane in Cecil B. DeMille's The Plainsman (1936) on another loan, this time for Paramount Pictures. Arthur, who was De Mille's second choice after Mae West, described Calamity Jane as her favorite role thus far.

In 1937 she appeared as a working girl, her typical role, in Mitchell Leisen's screwball comedy, Easy Living (1937), with Ray Milland. She followed this with another screwball comedy, Capra's You Can't Take It with You (1938), which teamed her with James Stewart.  The film won an Academy Award for Best Picture with Arthur getting top billing.

So strong was her box-office appeal by now that she was one of four finalists for the role of Scarlett O'Hara in Gone with the Wind (1939). The film's producer, David O. Selznick, had briefly romanced Arthur in the late 1920s when they both were with Paramount. Arthur reunited with director Frank Capra and Stewart for Mr. Smith Goes to Washington (1939), with Arthur cast once again as a working woman, this time one who teaches the naïve Mr. Smith the ways of Washington, DC. Arthur was offered a third reunion with Capra and Stewart in It's a Wonderful Life (1946), playing the role of Stewart's wife Mary (which eventually went to Donna Reed), but she refused in order to attend Stephens College.

Arthur continued to star in films such as Howard Hawks' Only Angels Have Wings (also 1939), with Cary Grant, The Talk of the Town (1942), directed by George Stevens (with Cary Grant and Ronald Colman, working together for the only time, as Arthur's two leading men), and again for Stevens as a government clerk in The More the Merrier (1943), for which Arthur was nominated for the Academy Award for Best Actress (losing to Jennifer Jones for The Song of Bernadette). As a result of being in dispute with studio boss Harry Cohn, her fee for The Talk of the Town (1942) was only $50,000, while her male co-stars Grant and Colman received upwards of $100,000 each.

Arthur remained Columbia's top star until the mid-1940s, when she left the studio; Rita Hayworth took over as the studio's biggest name. Stevens famously called her "one of the greatest comediennes the screen has ever seen," while Capra credited her as "my favorite actress."

Later career and retirements

Arthur retired when her contract with Columbia Pictures expired in 1944. She reportedly ran through the studio's streets, shouting "I'm free, I'm free!" For the next several years, she turned down virtually all film offers, the two exceptions being Billy Wilder's A Foreign Affair (1948), in which she played a congresswoman and rival of Marlene Dietrich's , and as a homesteader's wife in the classic Western Shane (1953), which turned out to be the biggest box-office hit of her career. The latter was her final film, and the only color film in which she appeared.

Arthur's postretirement work in theater was intermittent, somewhat curtailed by her unease and discomfort about working in public. Capra claimed she vomited in her dressing room between scenes, yet emerged each time to perform a flawless take. According to John Oller's biography, Jean Arthur: The Actress Nobody Knew (1997), Arthur developed a kind of stage fright punctuated with bouts of psychosomatic illnesses. A prime example was in 1945, when she was cast in the lead of the Garson Kanin play Born Yesterday. Her nerves and insecurity got the better of her and she left the production before it reached Broadway, opening the door for a then-unknown Judy Holliday to take the part.

She did score a major triumph on Broadway in 1950, starring in Leonard Bernstein's adaptation of Peter Pan, playing the title character, when she was almost 50. She tackled the role of her eponym, Joan of Arc, in a 1954 stage production of George Bernard Shaw's Saint Joan, but she left the play after a nervous breakdown and battles with director Harold Clurman.

After Shane and the Broadway play Joan of Arc, Arthur went into retirement for 11 years.  In 1965, she returned to show business in an episode of Gunsmoke.   In 1966, the extremely reclusive Arthur took on the role of Patricia Marshall, an attorney, on her own television sitcom, The Jean Arthur Show, which was cancelled midseason by CBS after only 12 episodes. Ron Harper played her son, attorney Paul Marshall.

In 1967, Arthur was coaxed back to Broadway to appear as a Midwestern spinster who falls in with a group of hippies in the play The Freaking Out of Stephanie Blake.  In his book The Season, William Goldman reconstructed the disastrous production, which eventually closed during previews when Arthur refused to go on.

Arthur next decided to teach drama, first at Vassar College and then the North Carolina School of the Arts.

While living in North Carolina, in 1973, Arthur made front-page news by being arrested and jailed for trespassing on a neighbor's property to console a dog she felt was being mistreated. An animal lover her entire life, Arthur said she trusted them more than people. She was convicted, fined $75, and given three years' probation.

After 11 performances of First Monday in October in Cleveland, Ohio, in 1975, Arthur then retired for good, retreating to Driftwood Cottage, her oceanside home on Carmel Point at the southern city limits of Carmel-by-the-Sea, California, steadfastly refusing interviews until her resistance was broken down by the author of a book about Capra. Arthur once famously said that she would rather have her throat slit than give an interview.

Arthur was a Democrat and supported the campaigns of Adlai Stevenson during the 1952 presidential election and John F. Kennedy in 1960.

Personal life

Arthur's first marriage, to photographer Julian Anker in 1928, was annulled after one day. She married producer Frank Ross Jr., in 1932. They divorced in 1949. She had no children by either union.

Arthur lived in Carmel-by-the-Sea, California for 30 years, and died from heart failure June 19, 1991, at the age of 90. No funeral service was held. She was cremated, and her remains were scattered off the coast of Point Lobos, California.

Legacy

Upon her death, film reviewer Charles Champlin wrote the following in the Los Angeles Times:

For her contribution to the motion-picture industry, Jean Arthur has a star on the Hollywood Walk of Fame at 6333 Hollywood Blvd. The Jean Arthur Atrium was her gift to the Monterey Institute of International Studies in Monterey, California.

In 2014, Arthur was inducted in the Hall of Great Western Performers at the National Cowboy & Western Heritage Museum.

Filmography

Radio performances

See also
 List of actors with Academy Award nominations
 List of actors with Hollywood Walk of Fame motion picture stars

References

Notes

Bibliography

 Capra, Frank. Frank Capra, The Name Above the Title: An Autobiography. New York: The Macmillan Company, 1971. .
 Harvey, James. Romantic Comedy in Hollywood: From Lubitsch to Sturges. New York: Knopf, 1987. .
 Oller, John. Jean Arthur: The Actress Nobody Knew. New York: Limelight Editions, 1997. .
 Parish, James Robert. The Hollywood Book of Death: The Bizarre, Often Sordid, Passings of More Than 125 American Movie and TV Idols. New York: Contemporary Books, 2002. .
 Parish, James Robert. The Hollywood Book of Extravagance: The Totally Infamous ... Hoboken, New Jersey: John Wiley and Sons, 2007. .
 Sarvady, Andrea, Molly Haskell and Frank Miller. Leading Ladies: The 50 Most Unforgettable Actresses of the Studio Era. San Francisco: Chronicle Books, 2006. .
 Stenn, David. Clara Bow: Runnin' Wild. New York: Doubleday, 1988. .

External links

 
 
 
 
 Literature on Jean Arthur
 Turner Classic Movies "Star of the Month" Profile
 Soares, Andre: Jean Arthur on TCM, Alternative Film Guide
 Gouveia, Michele: The Girl with the Croak: Jean Arthur
 Atkinson, Michael: Jean Therapy
 "Recalling Jean Arthur's teaching days at Vassar" in the Poughkeepsie Journal, December 31, 2014.
 John Oller Blogby the author of Jean Arthur: The Actress Nobody Knew, containing updates to the information in his book

1900 births
1991 deaths
20th-century American actresses
Actresses from New York (state)
American film actresses
American people of English descent
American people of Norwegian descent
American Protestants
American silent film actresses
American stage actresses
American television actresses
California Democrats
Maine Democrats
New York (state) Democrats
Paramount Pictures contract players
Columbia Pictures contract players
People from Carmel-by-the-Sea, California
People from Plattsburgh, New York
People from Westbrook, Maine
Vassar College faculty
WAMPAS Baby Stars
Western (genre) film actresses
American women academics